Lushan Botanical Garden, Chinese Academy of Sciences, is a botanical garden located within Mount Lu, Jiujiang, People's Republic of China. It is the first subtropical mountain botanical garden in China. Founded on August 20, 1934, it was originally called Lushan Forest Botanical Garden and was founded by Hu Xiansu, Ren-Chang Ching, and Chen Fenghuai. Since its founding, its affiliation and name has gone through several changes. Currently, it is under the administration of the Chinese Academy of Sciences and is composed of 13 special parks with over 5,000 species of plants. 

Lushan Botanical Garden is famous for its gymnosperm collection, which had been introduced from 15 countries. There are more than 200 species of Gymnosperms from 11 families and 41 genera within the Pinales special park.

It is also the location of the tomb of Chen Yinke and the "Tomb of the Three Elders" (Hu Xiansu, Ren-Chang Ching, and Chen Fenghuai), both of which are protected cultural relics.

References 

Botanical gardens in China